Preprocessing can refer to the following topics in computer science:

 Preprocessor, a program that processes its input data to produce output that is used as input to another program like a compiler
 Data pre-processing, used in machine learning and data mining to make input data easier to work with